Robert Germaine, Sr. (October 1, 1925 – April 1986), the son of French-Canadian immigrants, was a drug trafficker, burglar, and freelance writer in New York, NY.  He was friends with Henry Hill and involved in his criminal activities following the Lufthansa heist up to Hill's incarceration. Germaine was also a friend of Jimmy 'the Gent' Burke. On January 3, 1972, Germaine was one of the gunmen of the Pierre Hotel armed robbery, where he and his seven cohorts, after binding and gagging the hotel employees, taking the Pierre under siege, ransacked the safe deposit boxes, and plundered an estimated $28,000,000 in jewels and cash. (Refer to 'Contract Killer' by William Hoffman & Lake Headley). 

He was an excellent stick-up man and burglar. Robert was married and had one son, a chemicals salesman and small-time drug dealer called Robert Germaine Jr. He would later become a confidential informant who provided information led to the arrest of Henry Hill, and even subsequently his own father. At the time of his drug trafficking arrest, Germaine Sr was a self-proclaimed freelance writer working on a manuscript. He is portrayed in Goodfellas as the uncredited drug dealer played by Paul Herman.

Robert Germaine Sr was a self-proclaimed freelance novelist, an expert "stick up man" who accompanied mobsters on hijacking jobs, and later became Henry Hill's partner in his heroin and cocaine trafficking ring in New York. At the time of his partnership with Henry Hill, he was also a fugitive in connection with a botched armed robbery of a multi-million dollar wholesale jewelry store on East Fifty-Seventh Street in New York. He became a close friend of Henry Hill after the latter hired his son Germaine Jr. to do some landscaping at Hill's Rockville Centre, New York home.

Arrest And Capture

Nassau County investigators raided Germaine's Long Island home wearing bulletproof vests and wielding riot shotguns. When the cops walked in, Germaine Sr. insisted they had the wrong man and showed them his false identification claiming he was a freelance writer. He even showed the investigators the manuscript he was working on. The police brought him to the station house for questioning, whereupon they brought out his police record that he had received for a robbery conviction in Albany, New York, thus falsifying his claim. His son, a high-school dropout who worked as a chemical store salesman, testified against his father during the trial. It was later revealed that Germaine Jr. turned into an informant for the police because of his own arrest for trafficking in cocaine and barbiturates supplied by his father.

In 1980, Robert Germaine Jr. was shot and killed in Kew Gardens, Queens on orders from Jimmy Burke. The hitman was Angelo Sepe, an associate of Burke.

Writing Career
Robert Germaine Sr. was never able to get his writing published after his drug trafficking incarceration in 1980. The subject of the manuscript he had been working on was never disclosed. He was later released and moved to somewhere in Dade County, Florida dying a short while later of unknown causes.

References
 My Life Inside the Mafia: Henry Hill' by Nicholas Pileggi
 US Social Security Death Index
 Contract Killer'' by William Hoffman & Lake Headley

American people convicted of robbery
American drug traffickers
1925 births
1986 deaths
Lucchese crime family
Lucchese crime family heist
American people of French-Canadian descent